Lucknow district is a district located in the state of Uttar Pradesh in northern India. The city of Lucknow is the district headquarters and the district is part of Lucknow Division. It also is the capital of Uttar Pradesh Lucknow is Bounded on the east by Barabanki district, on the west by Unnao and Hardoi districts, on the south by Raebareli district and in the north by Sitapur district.

History
Located in what was historically known as the Awadh region, Lucknow has always been a multicultural place.

The Lucknow district that exists today was created by the British in 1856, upon their annexation of Oudh State. Under the Nawabs of Oudh, the area administered from Lucknow had been rather small, consisting of only the parganas immediately surrounding the city. This was known as the Huzur tehsil. The rest of the area had been part of other divisions whose headquarters lay outside the borders of the present-day district.

From 1856 until 1872, the new Lucknow district consisted of 10 parganas in 4 tehsils: Lucknow tehsil contained the 3 parganas of Lucknow, Bijnaur, and Kakori; Kursi tehsil contained the 3 parganas of Kursi, Dewa, and Mahona; Mohanlalganj tehsil contained the 2 parganas of Mohanlalganj and Nigohan; and Malihabad tehsil consisted of the 2 parganas of Malihabad and Auras-Mohan. In 1872, the first regular settlement conducted by the British was completed, and three parganas were transferred out of Lucknow district: Dewa and Kursi, the two easternmost parganas, were transferred to Barabanki district, while Auras-Mohan in the west was transferred to Unnao district. At the same time, the tehsils of Malihabad and Mahona were merged into a single entity.

Geography and climate

Lucknow district covers an area of 2,528 square kilometers, centrally located in both the central Ganges plain as well as Uttar Pradesh as a whole. It consists of three geographical sub-regions: the Gomti basin, the Lucknow-Uparwar plain, and the upper Sai catchments. The landscape is very flat, with virtually no hills. There is a gradual slope from northwest to southeast, following the course of the rivers. Geologically, it is made of light alluvium and dun gravels of relatively recent age. Scattered throughout the district are the nodular limestone deposits called kankar, which appear in beds of varying thickness located 2–5 feet below the surface.

The area was once lightly wooded, but by the turn of the 20th century most of this had been cut down. Large dhak forests covered parts of the old parganas of Malihabad, Mahona, and Mohanlalganj until the late 1800s, when they were cleared to make space for farms. By the early 1900s, the only large area of dhak forest that remained was in the northeastern corner of Mahona pargana. In 2008-09, it was recorded that 13,082 hectares of Lucknow district were under forest cover, representing 5.19% of the total land area. Of note is the Kukrail forest reserve, on the outskirts of the Lucknow metro area.

The main rivers of Lucknow district are the Gomti and the Sai. The Gomti enters the district at the meeting of the borders with Hardoi and Sitapur districts, and then winds its way through Lucknow district. The riverbed of the Gomti is significantly lower than the surrounding area, limiting its use for irrigation. In many places, the high banks of the Gomti are scarred with ravines, where rainfall has gradually eroded away the earth that used to be there. The main tributary of the Gomti is the Behta, a perennial stream which originates in Hardoi district and joins the Gomti near the village of Kankarabad. The other tributaries include the Loni and the nalas of Jhingi and Akraddi, as well as the Kukrail on the left bank. The Sai enters Lucknow district at the village of Sulsa Mau and flows toward the southeast, forming the border with Unnao district until it turns south at the village of Agahiya. The Sai's banks are shallower and less eroded than those of the Gomti. The main tributary of the Sai is the Bakh, which originates as a chain of jhils in a depression near Bijnaur.

There are also barren usar tracts, where there is little plant growth except for some small grasses that grow during the rainy season. They are often formed from soil saturation. They are most common in the southern and western parts of the district.

The climate of Lucknow district is predominantly subtropical in nature, and it experiences the effects of the South Asian monsoon. 
There are three main seasons: the summer season typically lasts from March to June, with May and June being the hottest months; then comes the rainy season, from July to October. The heaviest rains are during July and August. Then comes winter, which lasts from November until February. January is generally the coldest month. However, the Lucknow area has a fairly moderate climate, and does not experience particularly extreme temperatures. Frost sometimes happens here in cold weather, but it is rare.

Appointed Officers

Divisions
Lucknow district is divided into 4 tehsils: Lucknow, Malihabad, Mohanlalganj, and Bakshi Ka Talab. These tehsils are then divided into 8 community development blocks (vikas khand), as follows:
 Bakshi Ka Talab tehsil
 Bakshi Ka Talab
 Lucknow tehsil
 Chinhat
 Kakori
 Sarojani Nagar
 Malihabad tehsil
 Mal
 Malihabad
 Mohanlalganj tehsil
 Gosainganj
 Mohanlalganj

Lucknow district contains 807 villages and 498 gram panchayats.

Villages 
 

Bakkas
Mahurakala
Mastemoo

Politics

Parliamentary Constituencies

Legislative Assembly Constituencies

Demography
According to the 2011 census Lucknow district has a population of 4,589,838, roughly equal to the nation of Georgia or the US state of Louisiana. This gives it a ranking of 31st in India (out of a total of 640). Its population growth rate over the decade 2001-2011 was  25.79%. Lucknow has a sex ratio of 906 females for every 1000 males, and a literacy rate of 79.33%. Scheduled Castes made up 20.66% of the population.
According to the 2001 census Lucknow district had a population of 3,681,461.

Religion

There is harmony between people of different religions in the city of Lucknow. The Lucknow Pact between the Indian National Congress and the Muslim League was agreed upon at the joint session of both parties in 1915. Religious institutions include Sankat Mochan Hanuman Temple, Sri Ramakrishna Math and Chandrika Devi Temple.

Languages

At the time of the 2011 Census of India, 90.71% of the population in the district spoke Hindi (or a related language) and 7.56% Urdu as their first language.

Languages spoken here include Awadhi, a vernacular in the Hindi continuum spoken by over 38 million people, mainly in the Awadh region. Urdu and Hindi are also the two mainstream languages of the district. Lucknow city is also home to speakers of languages throughout India.

Agriculture
There are three harvests, called by the typical Hindustani names of rabi, kharif, and zaid. Rabi is the springtime harvest, Kharif is the autumn harvest, and Zaid is the hot-weather harvest. The most important of the three harvests is kharif, which historically has always involved larger areas of cultivation than Rabi. Of the kharif crops, the most important was traditionally rice, grown in two kinds: early rice, harvested in July and not grown very extensively, and late or transplanted rice, harvested in October and November and far more extensively grown, especially in areas with heavier clayey soils. The second most important kharif crop was historically juwar, grown in loamier soils, usually mixed with arhar, and often used as fodder. Bajra (pearl millet) has also traditionally been grown extensively, particularly in areas with sandier soil. Today, the main kharif crops in Lucknow district are rice, maize, juwar, bajra, urad, mung beans, and soybeans. As for the rabi crops, the most important are wheat and barley, followed by gram, peas, arhar, and oilseeds. In the early 20th century, peas and barley were not as widely grown. There are only a few zaid crops, of which the most important in Lucknow district has historically been the melon; the melons grown here have been renowned for their taste.

Most famous among Lucknow district's produce is the Dasheri mango, which are especially grown in the areas around Kakori and Malihabad. The Dasheri is said to have originated during the 18th century, as a chance seedling in the Nawab's gardens. Since then, the Dasheri has been spread throughout North India through continuous grafting.

Notes

==References==

External links

 

Places to Visit in Lucknow

 
Districts of Uttar Pradesh
Lucknow division
Minority Concentrated Districts in India